Alex Bengard (born March 13, 1979) is a retired American soccer player.

Career

College
Bengard played one year of college soccer at Mt. San Antonio College before transferring to California State University, Dominguez Hills. During his senior year Bengard broke the CSUDH single-season points record and earned the CCAA First Team All-Conference award, was named a First Team All-American, and won the Division 2 NCAA National Championship.

Professional
Bengard was drafted in the fifth round (57th overall) in the 2001 MLS SuperDraft by Los Angeles Galaxy. He played in 7 MLS games for Galaxy in his two years with the team, winning the 2001 U.S. Open Cup and the 2002 MLS Cup, before being waived at the end of the 2002 season.

Bengard dropped down a level to play in the USL First Division, with Seattle Sounders in 2003 and with Portland Timbers in 2004. After briefly playing with Toronto FC's reserves in 2007, Bengard returned to Southern California to work as a coach for local youth soccer organization Legends FC. He also played with Legends' USL Premier Development League team Los Angeles Storm in 2007.

In addition to his coaching work, Bengard also occasionally plays with the amateur Hollywood United, which plays in the Los Angeles-based USASA-affiliated Coast Soccer League. Bengard was part of the Hollywood team which beat Portland Timbers 3-2 in the first round of the 2008 Lamar Hunt U.S. Open Cup.

References

1979 births
Living people
American soccer players
Association football midfielders
Cal State Dominguez Hills Toros men's soccer players
LA Galaxy players
Portland Timbers (2001–2010) players
Seattle Sounders (1994–2008) players
LA Laguna FC players
Hollywood United players
USL League Two players
Major League Soccer players
LA Galaxy draft picks
A-League (1995–2004) players